In phonology, epenthesis (Greek ) means the addition of one or more sounds to a word, especially in the beginning syllable (prothesis) or in the ending syllable (paragoge) or in-between two syllabic sounds in a word. The word epenthesis comes from  "in addition to" and en- "in" and thesis "putting". Epenthesis may be divided into two types: excrescence for the addition of a consonant, and for the addition of a vowel, svarabhakti (in Hindi, Bengali and other North Indian languages, stemming from Sanskrit) or alternatively anaptyxis. The opposite process, where one or more sounds are removed, is referred to as elision.

Uses
Epenthesis arises for a variety of reasons. The phonotactics of a given language may discourage vowels in hiatus or consonant clusters, and a consonant or vowel may be added to make pronunciation easier. Epenthesis may be represented in writing, or it may be a feature only of the spoken language.

Separating vowels
A consonant may be added to separate vowels in hiatus, as is the case with linking and intrusive R in English.
drawing →  draw-r-ing

Bridging consonant clusters
A consonant may be placed between consonants in a consonant cluster where the place of articulation is different (such as if one consonant is labial and the other is alveolar). 
 something → somepthing
hamster → hampster
 *a-mrotos → ambrotos (see below)

Breaking consonant clusters
A vowel may be placed between consonants to separate them.
Hamtramck  →  Hamtramick

Other contexts
While epenthesis most often occurs between two vowels or two consonants, it can also occur between a vowel and a consonant or at the ends of words.

Excrescence
Excrescence is the epenthesis of a consonant.

Historical sound change
Latin  > French  ("to tremble")
Old English  > English thunder
 French ,  > English messenger, passenger
 French ,  > Portuguese , 
(Reconstructed) Proto-Germanic  > Old English , Old Saxon  ("to sow")
(Reconstructed) Proto-Greek  > Ancient Greek   ("immortal"; cf. ambrosia)
Latin  > homne > homre > Spanish  ("man")

Synchronic rule
In French,  is inserted in inverted interrogative phrases between a verb ending in a vowel and a pronoun beginning with a vowel:  ('he has') >  ('has he?').

A similar example is the English indefinite article a, which becomes an before a vowel. It originated from Old English  ("one, a, an"), which retained an n in all positions, so a diachronic analysis would see the original n disappearing except if a following vowel required its retention: an > a. However, a synchronic analysis, in keeping with the perception of most native speakers, would (equally correctly) see it as epenthesis: a > an.

In Dutch, whenever the suffix  (which has several meanings) is attached to a word already ending in -r, an additional  is inserted in between.

Variable rule

In English, a stop consonant is often added as a transitional sound between the parts of a nasal + fricative sequence:
English hamster  often pronounced with an added p sound, GA:  or RP: 
English warmth  often pronounced with an added p sound, GA:  or RP: 
English fence  often pronounced

Poetic device
Latin  "remnants, survivors" (accusative plural) > poetic 
The three short syllables in  do not fit into dactylic hexameter because of the dactyl's limit of two short syllables so the first syllable is lengthened by adding another l. However, the pronunciation was often not written with double ll, and may have been the normal way of pronouncing a word starting in rel- rather than a poetic modification.

In Japanese
A limited number of words in Japanese use epenthetic consonants to separate vowels. That is a synchronic analysis. As for a diachronic (historical) analysis, since epenthetic consonants are not used regularly in modern Japanese, the epenthetic  could be from Old Japanese. It is also possible that Old Japanese /ame2/ was once pronounced */same2/; the  would then be not epenthetic but simply an archaic pronunciation.

One hypothesis argues that Japanese  developed "as a default, epenthetic consonant in the intervocalic position".

Anaptyxis 
Epenthesis of a vowel is known as anaptyxis (from Greek  "unfolding"). Some accounts distinguish between "intrusive" optional vowels, vowel-like releases of consonants as phonetic detail, and true epenthetic vowels that are required by the phonotactics of the language and are acoustically identical with phonemic vowels.

Historical sound change

End of word
Many languages insert a so-called prop vowel at the end of a word, often as a result of the common sound change where vowels at the end of a word are deleted. For example, in the Gallo-Romance languages, a prop schwa /ə/ was added when final non-open vowels were dropped leaving /Cr/ clusters at the end, e.g. Latin nigrum '(shiny) black' > * > Old French negre  'black' (thus avoiding the impermissible , cf. carrum > char 'cart').

Middle of word
Similarly as above, a vowel may be inserted in the middle of a word to resolve an impermissible word-final consonant cluster. An example of this can be found in Lebanese Arabic, where /ˈʔalɪb/ 'heart' corresponds to Modern Standard Arabic  /qalb/ and Egyptian Arabic /ʔælb/. In the development of Old English, Proto-Germanic  'field, acre' would have ended up with an impermissible  final cluster (*æcr), so it was resolved by inserting an /e/ before the rhotic consonant:  (cf. the use of a syllabic consonant in Gothic ).

Vowel insertion in the middle of a word can be observed in the history of the Slavic languages, which had a preference for open syllables in medieval times. Other Slavic languages used metathesis for the vowel and the syllable-final consonant, producing *grodŭ in this case, as seen in Polish , Old Church Slavonic градъ gradŭ, Serbo-Croatian  and Czech .

Another environment can be observed in the history of Modern Persian, in which former word-initial consonant clusters, which were still extant in Middle Persian, are regularly broken up: Middle Persian brādar 'brother' > modern Iranian Persian   , Middle Persian stūn 'column' > Early New Persian   > modern Iranian Persian   .

In Spanish, as a phonetic detail, it is usual to find a schwa vowel in sequences of a consonant followed by a flap. For instance,  'vinegar' may be  but also . 

Many Indo-Aryan languages carry an inherent vowel after each consonant. For example, in Assamese, the inherent vowel is "o" (অ), while in Hindi and Marathi, it is "a" (अ). Sanskrit words like "maaŋsa" (meat, মাংস), "ratna" (jewel, ৰত্ন), "yatna" (effort, যত্ন), "padma" (lotus, পদ্ম), "harsha" (joy, হৰ্ষ), "dvaara" ("door", দ্বাৰ) etc. become "moŋoh" (মাংস > মঙহ), "roton" (ৰত্ন > ৰতন), "zoton" (যত্ন > যতন), "podum" (পদ্ম > পদুম), "horix" (হৰ্ষ > হৰিষ), "duwar" (দ্বাৰ > দুৱাৰ) etc. in Assamese. Other, non-Tatsama words also undergo anaptyxis, for example, the English word "glass" becomes "gilas" (গিলাছ).

Beginning of word
Latin  'two-edged sword, typically used by cavalry' becomes the normal word for 'sword' in Romance languages with an inserted : Spanish/Portuguese , Catalan , Old French  > modern  (see also  'swordfish').

French in fact presents three layers in the vocabulary in which initial vowel epenthesis is or is not applied, depending on the time a word came into the language:
 insertion of epenthetic  in inherited and commonly-used learned and semi-learned words, which then drop the following  after the medieval period: Latin  > Old French  > modern  'star',  > Old French  > modern  'study',  > OF  > modern  'school'
 then in the modern period,  is not inserted and uncommon old learned borrowings are remolded to look more like Latin:  > ,  > ,  > learned Old French  > remolded to modern

Grammatical rule
Epenthesis often breaks up a consonant cluster or vowel sequence that is not permitted by the phonotactics of a language. Regular or semi-regular epenthesis commonly occurs in languages with affixes. However, this is a synchronic analysis as the vowel was originally present in the suffix but has been lost in most words.

Borrowed words
Vocalic epenthesis typically occurs when words are borrowed from a language that has consonant clusters or syllable codas that are not permitted in the borrowing language.

Languages use various vowels, but schwa is quite common when it is available:
 Hebrew uses a single vowel, the schwa (pronounced  in Israeli Hebrew).
For example, English cap becomes   in Japanese; English street,  ; the Dutch name ,  ; and the German name ,  .
For example, English strike becomes  , with three epenthetic  vowels and a split of English diphthong  into two syllables.
Most speakers pronounce borrowings with spelling pronunciations, and others try to approximate the nearest equivalents in Portuguese of the phonemes in the original language. The word stress became estresse as in the example above.
 Classical Arabic does not allow clusters at the beginning of a word, and typically uses  to break up such clusters in borrowings: Latin  >   'street'. In Modern Standard Arabic and Egyptian Arabic, copy vowels are often used as well, e.g. English/French klaxon (car horn) > Egyptian Arabic كلكس  'car horn', but note French blouse > Egyptian Arabic بلوزة  (where  corresponds to MSA ). Many other modern varieties such as North Levantine Arabic and Moroccan Arabic allow word-initial clusters however.
 Turkish prefixes close vowels to loanwords with initial clusters of alveolar fricatives followed by another consonant:  < Greek ,  < set screw,  < Greek ,  < Byzantine Greek ,  < steamboat,  < Scotland,  < Greek ,   < Greek . The practice is no longer productive as of late 20th century and a few such words have changed back:  <  < French .

Informal speech
Epenthesis most often occurs within unfamiliar or complex consonant clusters.

Epenthesis is sometimes used for humorous or childlike effect. For example, the cartoon character Yogi Bear says "pic-a-nic basket" for picnic basket.

Some dialects also use , which is deemed as stereotypical of people from lower classes, such as those arriving from rural flight in internal migrations to cities such as Rio de Janeiro, Brasília and São Paulo.

In Finnish
In Finnish, there are two epenthetic vowels and two nativization vowels. One epenthetic vowel is the preceding vowel, found in the illative case ending :  → ,  → .

In Standard Finnish, consonant clusters may not be broken by epenthetic vowels; foreign words undergo consonant deletion rather than addition of vowels:  ("shore") from Proto-Germanic . However, modern loans may not end in consonants. Even if the word, such as a personal name, is native, a paragogic vowel is needed to connect a consonantal case ending to the word. The vowel is :  → , or in the case of personal name,  +  →  "about Bush" (elative case).

In Standard Finnish, they are slightly intensified before a consonant in a medial cluster: .

For example,  "Ostrobothnia" → ,  → , and Savo  → . Ambiguities may result:  "strait" vs. . Also, in a small region in Savo,  is used instead.)

In constructed languages
Lojban, a constructed language that seeks logically-oriented grammatical and phonological structures, uses a number of consonant clusters in its words. Since it is designed to be as universal as possible, it allows a type of anaptyxis called "buffering" to be used if a speaker finds a cluster difficult or impossible to pronounce. A vowel sound that is nonexistent in Lojban (usually /ɪ/ as in "hit") is added between two consonants to make the word easier to pronounce. Despite altering the phonetics of a word, the use of buffering is completely ignored by grammar. Also, the vowel sound used must not be confused with any existing Lojban vowel.

An example of buffering in Lojban is that if a speaker finds the cluster  in the word  ("cat") (pronounced ) hard or impossible to pronounce, the vowel  can be pronounced between the two consonants, resulting in the form . Nothing changes grammatically, including the word's spelling and the syllabication.

In sign language
A type of epenthesis in sign language is known as "movement epenthesis" and occurs, most commonly, during the boundary between signs while the hands move from the posture required by the first sign to that required by the next.

Related phenomena
Prothesis: the addition of a sound to the beginning of a word
Paragoge: the addition of a sound to the end of a word
Infixation: the insertion of a morpheme within a word
Tmesis: the inclusion of a whole word within another one
Metathesis: the reordering of sounds within a word

See also
 Assibilation
 Assimilation
 Coarticulation (Co-articulated consonant, Secondary articulation)
 Consonant harmony
 Crasis
 Dissimilation
 Labialisation
 Language game
 Lenition
 Metathesis
 Palatalization
 Pharyngealisation
 Sandhi
 Velarization
 Vowel harmony

References

Sources

External links
Definition at BYU

Phonotactics
Phonology
Figures of speech